Seppo Antero Särkiniemi (born 11 April 1957 in Lappajärvi) is a Finnish Lutheran clergyman and politician. He was a member of the Parliament of Finland from 2003 to 2007 and again from 2010 to 2011, representing the Centre Party.

References

1957 births
Living people
People from Lappajärvi
20th-century Finnish Lutheran clergy
Centre Party (Finland) politicians
Members of the Parliament of Finland (2003–07)
Members of the Parliament of Finland (2007–11)
University of Helsinki alumni
21st-century Finnish Lutheran clergy